The O2 Academy may refer to one of a number of Academy Music Group venues in the United Kingdom (in alphabetical order):

 O2 Academy Birmingham
 O2 Academy Bournemouth
 O2 Academy Bristol
 O2 Academy Brixton
 O2 Academy Edinburgh
 O2 Academy Glasgow
 O2 Academy Islington
 O2 Academy Leeds
 O2 Academy Leicester
 O2 Academy Liverpool
 O2 Academy Newcastle
 O2 Academy Oxford
 O2 Academy Sheffield